M. S. Mani was an Indian politician and former Member of the Legislative Assembly of Tamil Nadu. He was elected to the Tamil Nadu legislative assembly from Tiruchirappalli - I constituency as a Dravida Munnetra Kazhagam candidate in 1962 and 1967 elections.

References 

Dravida Munnetra Kazhagam politicians
Possibly living people
Year of birth missing
Members of the Tamil Nadu Legislative Assembly